Aeantides is the name of several people in Classical antiquity:

 Aeantides, the tyrant of Lampsacus, to whom Hippias gave his daughter Archedice in marriage.
 Aeantides, a tragic poet of Alexandria, mentioned as one of the seven poets who formed the Alexandrian Pleiad.  He lived in the time of Ptolemy II.

References

Sources

Ancient Greek dramatists and playwrights
People from Lampsacus
Tragic poets
Year of birth unknown
Year of death unknown